Rubén Montesinos Gimeno is a Spanish Taekwondo athlete. He is an eight-time Spanish National Heavyweight (+84 kg) Champion, and won the World Heavyweight Championship in Madrid in 2005.
  
However, Montesinos did not qualify for either the 2004 or 2008 Olympics, losing his spot to two-time European Middleweight (-84 kg) Champion Jon Garcia in the +80 kg category at the Spanish Olympic Trials.

References
 Profile

Spanish male taekwondo practitioners
Living people
Year of birth missing (living people)
World Taekwondo Championships medalists
20th-century Spanish people
21st-century Spanish people